Khovrino is the name of several rural localities in Russia:
Khovrino, Moscow Oblast, a village under the administrative jurisdiction of the city of Mytishchi, Mytishchinsky District, Moscow Oblast
Khovrino, Tver Oblast, a village in Sandovsky District of Tver Oblast
Khovrino, Ulyanovsk Oblast, a selo under the administrative jurisdiction of Veshkaymsky Settlement Okrug of Veshkaymsky District, Ulyanovsk Oblast